Erigavo District is a district in the central Sanaag region of Somaliland. It is the largest and most populous district in Sanaag. Its capital lies at Erigavo.

Demographics
The total population of Erigavo District is 220,546. The district is exclusively inhabited by people from the Somali ethnic group, namely the Habar Yoonis in the north and the Dhulbahante in the south of the district.

Towns and Villages
Damala Hagare
Maydh - An ancient port city.
Yubbe - There is a Somaliland military base.
Hadaftimo - There is a Puntland military base.
Armale
Guud Caanood
Heis - A historic coastal town.
Qaʽableh - Numerous archaeological sites and ancient tombs.
Yufle 
Midhisho
Fiqifuliye
Gelweita - An archaeological site and a key rock art site.
Dayaha
Jidali
Waqdariya - A coastal village.

See also
Administrative divisions of Somaliland
Regions of Somaliland
Districts of Somaliland
Somalia–Somaliland border

References

External links
 Administrative map of Erigavo District
 Districts of Somalia

Districts of Somaliland
Sanaag